This is a list of rivers in Bulgaria.

The longest river that Bulgaria has a bank on is the Danube (2,888 km), which spans most of the country's northern border. The longest one to run through the country (and also the deepest) is the Maritsa (480 km), while the longest river that runs solely in Bulgaria is the Iskar (368 km).

Regions

A country rich in water resources, Bulgaria has a large number of rivers that are divided into several regions based on their mouth's location.

Rivers of northern Bulgaria, with the exception of the very east of the region, are typically tributaries of the Danube. Notable rivers in the area are the Iskar, Vit, Ogosta, Osam and Yantra.

The rivers in the eastern part of the country are typically short (except for Kamchiya) and flow into the Black Sea. Notable rivers in the region include the Kamchiya, Batova, Provadiyska, Devnenska, Ropotamo, Veleka and Rezovska.

Most of the rivers that rise in southern Bulgaria have their mouths in the Aegean Sea outside Bulgarian territory. A notable exception is the Iskar that takes its source from Rila and runs through Stara Planina forming a gorge to reach the Danube. Depending on their location, they are divided into two regions, a Western Aegean and Eastern Aegean one. The former embraces the Struma and Mesta, while rivers in the latter include the Arda, Maritsa and Tundzha.

List

 Archar River
 Arda
 Batova reka
 Bistritsa
 Bunayska
 Danube
 Deleynska reka
 Devil's River
 Dospat
 Dzhulyunitsa
 Erma
 Fakiyska reka
 Iskar
 Cherni Iskar
 Palakaria
 Kamchiya
 Golyama Kamchiya (Bulgarian: Big Kamchiya)
 Luda Kamchiya (Bulgarian: Mad Kamchiya)
 Kajalijka (river flowing through Iskra and Bryagovo into the Maritsa) 
Kriva
 Krumovitsa
 Lebnitsa
 Lom
 Luda Reka (Bulgarian Mad River)
 Byala reka (Bulgarian: White river)
 Luda Yana (Bulgarian: Mad Yana)
 Maritsa
 Matevir
 Mechka (Bulgarian: Bear)
 Mesta
 Bela Mesta (Bulgarian: White Mesta)
 Cherna Mesta (Bulgarian: Black Mesta)
 Ogosta
 Osam
 Provadiyska reka (Bulgarian: River of Provadia)
 Pyasachnik (Bulgarian: Sandstone)
 Rezovo
 Ropotamo
 Rusenski Lom
 Beli Lom (Bulgarian: White Lom)
 Cherni Lom (Bulgarian: Black Lom)
 Rusokastrenska reka (Bulgarian: River of Rusokastro)
 Sazliyka

 Shirokolashka reka (Bulgarian: River of Shiroka Laka)
 Sredetska
 Stara reka (Bulgarian: Old river)
 Struma 
 Rilska reka
 Strumeshnitsa
 Stryama
 Suha reka (Bulgarian: Dry river)
 Timok
 Topolnitsa (in Bulgarian, Topola means poplar)
 Tsibritsa
 Tundzha
 Vacha
 Varbitsa
 Veleka
 Vit
 Beli Vit (Bulgarian: White Vit)
 Cherni Vit (Bulgarian: Black Vit)
 Voynishka reka (Bulgarian: Soldier's river)
 Yantra
 Rositsa
 Zlatna Panega (Bulgarian: Golden Panega)

Note: in Bulgarian, reka means river.

See also
 Geography of Bulgaria
 Reservoirs and dams in Bulgaria

Bulgaria
Rivers